R45 may refer to:
 R45 (EP), by Death Piggy
 R45 (South Africa), a road
 BMW R45, a motorcycle
 , a destroyer of the Royal Navy
 R45: May cause cancer, a risk phrase